Charles Hicks (?–1902) was an African American advance man, manager, performer, and owner of blackface minstrel troupes composed of African American performers.

Charles Hicks may also refer to:

 Charles Hicks (athlete) (born 2001), British–American athlete
 Charlie Hicks (1939–2015), American broadcaster
 Charley Lincoln (1900–1963), aka Charlie Hicks
 Charles R. Hicks (1767–1827), Second Principal Chief of the Cherokee Nation